Chat line is a services allowing for people to communicate with one another by telephone call.  However, more recent chat lines are similar to CB radio in which a number of people both listen and speak together.

See also
 Instant messaging
 Online chat
 Party line (telephony)
 Synchronous conferencing
 Videotelephony

References

Calling features
Local loop
Smartphones
Technology in society